Emmanuel Ugochucku Chigozie (born 28 August 1991) is a Nigerian professional footballer who plays as a defender who last played for Aryan in the Calcutta Football League.

Career
Chigozie started his career with Indian side, Aizawl, before moving to Mizoram Police AC of the Mizoram Premier League. He returned to Aizawl before the 2015–16 season.

Chigozie made his professional debut for Aizawl in the I-League on 9 January 2016 against the reigning champions, Mohun Bagan. He played the full match as Aizawl lost 3–1.

I-League statistics

References

Living people
Nigerian footballers
Aizawl FC players
Association football defenders
I-League players
Expatriate footballers in India
Nigerian expatriate footballers
Nigerian expatriate sportspeople in India
1991 births
Calcutta Football League players
Aryan FC players
Gokulam Kerala FC players
United SC players